Bangladesh Education and Research Network (BERNET) is an educational project governed by the University Grants Commission of Bangladesh aimed at constructing a cooperative network among the universities of Bangladesh for better research capability.

History
Bangladesh Education and Research Network was established in 2009. A trust was established in 2019. The trust has 78 private and state-owned universities as members. The network is financed by the Government of Bangladesh and the World Bank.

Organization
The central node of the network is in the premises of the BUGC situated at Agargaon, Sher-e-Bangla Nagar, Dhaka.

See also
 University Grants Commission of Bangladesh (BUGC)

References

Education in Bangladesh
Learned societies of Bangladesh
2009 establishments in Bangladesh
Organisations based in Dhaka

Education research institutes in Bangladesh